Alice Wegemund (born 7 June 1907 - died 1976) was an Australian cricket player. Wegemund played two Tests for the Australia national women's cricket team.

References

1907 births
1976 deaths
Australia women Test cricketers